Cyclemys enigmatica, also known as the enigmatic leaf turtle, is a species of Asian leaf turtle. It is found in the Greater Sunda Islands and the Malay Peninsula.

Description
In the enigmatic leaf turtle, the carapace is dark brown and slightly reddish, ovoid, and lacks patterns in adults. The plastron is dark brown to black with or without dense, black, radiating patterns. The head is tan to a light reddish-brown in color. The throat and neck are uniformly dark. The bridge is dark brown to black. Hatchlings lack head and neck stripes and have brownish, mottled plastrons.

Distribution 
Its geographic range overlaps with C. dentata. It is found in southern Malay Peninsula (southern Thailand, Malaysia), Borneo (Sarawak, Malaysia, and Kalimantan, Indonesia), and Java and Sumatra (Indonesia).

See also
Cyclemys

References

Cyclemys
Turtles of Asia
Reptiles of Indonesia
Reptiles of Malaysia
Reptiles of Thailand
Reptiles described in 2008
Reptiles of Borneo